Overengineering (or over-engineering), is the act of designing a product or providing a solution to a problem in an elaborate or complicated manner, where a simpler solution can be demonstrated to exist with the same efficiency and effectiveness as that of the original design.

Overengineering is often identified with design changes that increase a factor of safety, add functionality, or overcome perceived design flaws that most users would accept. It can be desirable when safety or performance is critical (e.g. in aerospace vehicles and luxury road vehicles), or when extremely broad functionality is required (e.g. diagnostic and medical tools, power users of products), but it is generally criticized in terms of value engineering as wasteful of resources such as materials, time and money. NASA listed excessive features as one of the top 10 risks of failure for development projects, and Mercedes-Benz developed and removed 600 non-essential features from their cars due to malfunctions, lack of usability and customer complaints. 

As a design philosophy, it is the opposite of the minimalist ethos of "less is more" (or: “worse is better”) and a disobedience of the KISS principle.

Overengineering generally occurs in high-end products or specialized markets. In one form, products are overbuilt and have performance far in excess of expected normal operation (a city car that can travel at 300 km/h, or a home video recorder with a projected lifespan of 100 years), and hence are more expensive, bulkier, and heavier than necessary. Alternatively, they may become overcomplicated – the extra functions may be unnecessary, and potentially reduce the usability of the product by overwhelming lesser experienced and technically literate end users, as in feature creep. Overengineering often results in feature fatigue. Feature fatigue is the difficulty experienced by users when a product offers an excessive amount of features. This creates overcomplexity, making it hard for users to use the product or service regularly.

Overengineering can decrease the productivity of design teams, because of the need to build and maintain more features than most users need.

Excessive pursuit of simplicity and minimalism in a product in order to avoid these effects, however, can result in premature optimisation, potentially to the detriment of the project due to diminishing returns on time and effort invested in the design process, thus also constituting overengineering.

Cultural references 
A story about very precise engineering is given in the 1858 story The Deacon's Masterpiece or, the Wonderful "One-hoss Shay": A Logical Story by Oliver Wendell Holmes, Sr., which tells of a carriage (one-horse shay)
That was built in such a logical way
It ran a hundred years to a day,
And then,
...
went to pieces all at once, --
All at once, and nothing first, --
Just as bubbles do when they burst.
Because it had been engineered so that no single piece failed first – no piece was over-engineered relative to the others, and they thus all collapsed at the same time.

A similar quote by Ferdinand Porsche claimed "the perfect race car crosses the finish line in first place and immediately falls into pieces."

Examples

German Second World War arms, like the famous Tiger I tank, have been called 'over-engineered' in comparison to their Soviet rivals such as the T-34. German arms allegedly used expensive materials and excessively labour intensive production processes, limiting production and making them hard to repair when they broke down in the field. 

A modern example is Juicero, a wi-fi "smart" juicing press. After its release, Bloomberg News published a story that showed that the juice packs could be squeezed by hand faster than the press, and that hand-squeezing produced juice that was near-indistinguishable in quality and quantity from the output of the machine, which cost $400 even after a price reduction.

See also 
 Technical debt
 Feature creep
 You aren't gonna need it 
 Juicero
 Planned obsolescence
 skyTran
 Useless machine
 Writing in space

References

External links 
"Code Simplicity ", Code Simplicity: The Science of Software Development Book, O'Reilly Media, Max Kanat-Alexander, March 2012
"Stop Over-Engineering!", Software Development magazine, Joshua Kerievsky, April 2002
"Overengineering: How much is too much?", EDN magazine, Paul Rako, January 2008

Engineering concepts
Product design